ICHR may refer to:

 Indian Council of Historical Research
 The Independent Commission for Human Rights